The 1972–73 Israel State Cup (Gvia HaMedina) was the 34th season of Israel's nationwide football cup competition and the 19th after the Israeli Declaration of Independence.

Starting with this edition, later rounds, which involved Liga Leumit clubs, were played as two-legged ties, up to the final, which remained a single match.

The competition was won by last year's finalist, Hapoel Jerusalem, who have beaten this season's league champions, Hakoah Maccabi Ramat Gan 2–0 at the final.

Results

Fourth Round

Fifth Round

Sixth Round

|}

Round of 16

|}

Quarter-finals

|}

Semi-finals

|}

Final

Notes

References
100 Years of Football 1906-2006, Elisha Shohat (Israel), 2006, pp. 229-230
Cup (Pages 8-9) Hadshot HaSport, 10.12.1972, archive.football.co.il 
Cup (Pages 8-9) Hadshot HaSport, 31.12.1972, archive.football.co.il 
Two times 56 goals were scored in the two rounds! (Page 1), Cup (Pages 3-6) Hadshot HaSport, 21.1.1973, archive.football.co.il 

Israel State Cup
State Cup
Israel State Cup seasons